Strahinja Stojačić (born July 15, 1992) is a Serbian professional basketball player who last played for Hercegovac Gajdobra of the Second Basketball League of Serbia.

External links
 Strahinja Stojačić at abaliga.com
 Strahinja Stojačić at realgm.com
 Strahinja Stojačić at eurobasket.com

1992 births
Living people
ABA League players
Basketball League of Serbia players
BK NH Ostrava players
KK Hercegovac Gajdobra players
KK FMP players
KK Mega Basket players
KK Radnički Kragujevac (2009–2014) players
KK Smederevo players
OKK Konstantin players
Serbian men's basketball players
Serbian expatriate basketball people in Slovakia
Serbian expatriate basketball people in the Czech Republic
Shooting guards
Basketball players from Novi Sad
BKM Lučenec players